Ishøj station is a railway station on the Køge radial of the S-train network in Copenhagen, Denmark. It serves the urbanized coastal end of Ishøj municipality.

The Greater Copenhagen Light Rail is expected to have its southern terminus at Ishøj station.

See also
 List of railway stations in Denmark

References

External links

S-train (Copenhagen) stations
Railway stations opened in 1976
Buildings and structures in Ishøj Municipality
Railway stations in Denmark opened in the 20th century